Brickey Rangers is a GAA club 5 km west of Dungarvan, County Waterford, Republic of Ireland. They cater for Gaelic football, camogie and Hurling. Their home ground is Bushy Park, which was opened in 1984.

The club have won the Waterford Senior Football Championship 1 time, in 1963. They have finished runner up on five occasions, the last being in 1960.

2016 football season

2016 Championship Football

History

Founded in 1896 as Brickey Rangers, the club did not have their first game until 1917.It was decided to visit all the houses in the Valley to gather the price of a football. Mike Linehan and Johnny Ronayne (the joint treasures of the club) collected from people at one end of the Valley and Johnny Murphy and Jack Flynn on the Knockmaun side. The first jersey's worn by the club were all white. The first game played by the club was against Modeligo in Dempsey's field Dungarvan GAA. In 1963 the club captured their only Waterford Senior Football Championship beating Kill 2-8 to 1-03 on the 2nd week of December. They have been relegated from the senior ranks numerous times. In 1980, 1986 and 2014 they regained promotion to the Waterford Senior Football Championship by winning the Waterford Intermediate Football Championship.

Bushy Park
The club was established in 1896 but we did not have a permanent base until 1984 when they purchased six acres from the Bon Sauveur Sisters at Carriglea, approximately 5 km from Dungarvan and named it Bushy Park. In 2004 an additional adjoining 5.25 acres was purchased to provide a second full-size playing pitch and training area. In more recent years, they have developed the facilities further by the provision of a hurling wall court, extended the club pavilion/additional dressing rooms, and provided car parking facilities. Very recently we installed flood-lighting to one of our pitches.

Current membership
The club has adult and juvenile committees with representatives from all the various divisions/interests in the club who help steer and run the club.  On the playing front, they participate in both football and hurling, camogie, ladies football and have teams in all juvenile age-groups.  The catchment area includes an extensive area around the Brickey valley and environs of Dungavan.  It has close links with two local national schools – Glenbeg and Carriglea and relationships with neighbours the Bon Sauveur Sisters at Carriglea.  There are currently approximately 300 members.

2014 season
The First XV, won the Western and County Waterford Intermediate Football Championship and were Waterford GAA representatives in the Munster Intermediate Club Football Championship. The Minor football team won the Western A championship. The Brickey First XV Hurling team remained in the Waterford Intermediate Hurling Championship

2015 season
The newly repromoted Brickey outfit made it out of the group stages and into the Quarter Finals against The Nire, however, they were knocked out of the competition. The Under-21 football team won the Western B championship. The Minor football team won the western B championship and finished county B runner-up's. The Under-21 hurling team won the Western B championship. The Brickey First XV Hurling team remained in the Waterford Intermediate Hurling Championship.

2016 season 
The Brickey football First XV suffered from second season syndrome and narrowly avoided relegation back to the Waterford Intermediate Football Championship. For the first time in a number of seasons the u21 team appeared in the Western A division, however they were knocked out at the Quarter Final stages. The u21 hurling team were knocked out of the Western B after one game. The Brickey First XV Hurling team remained in the Waterford Intermediate Hurling Championship, however launched a strong challenge for the Western title.

Football titles
 Waterford Senior Football Championship (1 time):
 1963
 West Waterford Under-21 Football Championship (2 times):
 2012, 2015
 West Waterford Minor B Football Championship (3 times):
 2013, 2014, 2015
 Waterford Junior Football Championship: (3)
 1927, 1941, 1945
 Waterford Intermediate Football Championship (4)
 1980, 1986, 2006, 2014

Hurling titles
 Waterford Junior Hurling Championship  
 1944, 1959, 2005

Notable players
Jimmy Curran

Jim McGrath -- Waterford GAA County Senior Footballer 1980-1990's, Munster Provincial side 80's,90's.

Cormac Curran -- Waterford GAA County Senior Hurler, 2013 All Ireland Minor Hurling Championship winner.

Conor Phelan -- Waterford GAA County Senior Footballer 2008-2014

Conor McGrath -- Waterford GAA County Senior Footballer Late 2000s - Early 2010s

Dermot O'Neill -- Derry GAA County Senior Footballer 1990's.

Kieran O' Neill -- Waterford GAA County Senior Footballer 2014 – present

References

External links
Brickey Rangers 

Gaelic games clubs in County Waterford
Gaelic football clubs in County Waterford